1994 in philosophy

Events

Publications 
 Harold Bloom, The Western Canon: The Books and School of the Ages, 1994
 John McDowell, Mind and World, 1994
 John Zerzan, Future Primitive and Other Essays, 1994
 Michio Kaku, Hyperspace, 1994
 Homi K. Bhabha, The Location of Culture, 1994
 Bernard Stiegler, Technics and Time, 1: The Fault of Epimetheus, 1994
 Cornel West, Race Matters, 1994
 Michael A. Smith, The Moral Problem, 1994

Deaths 
 February 11 - Paul Feyerabend (born 1924)
 June 2 - David Stove (born 1927) 
 September 17 - Karl Popper (born 1902) 
 November 30 - Guy Debord (born 1931)

References 

Philosophy
20th-century philosophy
Philosophy by year